Princess Teruko (曦子内親王; 1224 – 5 October 1262) later known as Senkamon-in (仙華門院), was an Empress of Japan as the Honorary Mother of her nephew Emperor Go-Saga. 

She was the daughter of Emperor Tsuchimikado and court lady Omiya-no-Tsubone (大宮局).

Notes

Japanese empresses
1224 births
1262 deaths
Japanese princesses
Saigū